Dean L. Hubbard (born 1939) is an American academic administrator. He was the president of Northwest Missouri State University from 1984 until 2009—the longest of any president in the school's history.

During Hubbard's tenure the school avoided an announced closing and created the first electronic campus in the United States. It also experienced success in sports, with Northwest appearing in six national title games and playing some games at Arrowhead Stadium in Kansas City.
 Before retiring in 2009 a program was started to replace students' printed textbooks with the electronic books or ebooks.

Before Northwest Missouri
Hubbard received bachelor's and master's degrees from Andrews University in Berrien Springs, Michigan.  While living in South Korea from 1966 to 1971 he received a degree in Korean language from Yonsei University in Seoul. He then received a Ph.D. from Stanford University.

In 1972 he became a consultant at Union College in Nebraska. He rose to become chief academic officer and then the school's president in 1980.

Northwest Missouri

In 1984 he moved to Northwest where he launched his plan for a computer in every room to make the claim to be the first electronic public university campus in the United States by the time it was rolled out in 1987.

In 1988 Hubbard resolved a crisis when the Missouri Department of Education under John Ashcroft proposed closing Northwest and designating Missouri Western State University 40 miles south in St. Joseph, Missouri as the only state university in northwest Missouri.

Seeking to differentiate Northwest Missouri from Missouri Western, Hubbard launched a strategy emphasizing a culture of quality. Northwest Missouri State won Missouri Quality Awards — modeled on the Malcolm Baldrige National Quality Award, and currently administered by the Midwest Excellence Institute — in 1997, 2001, 2005, and 2008, the most of any organization in Missouri history.

Football powerhouse
The most visible differentiation was Hubbard's hiring of Mel Tjeerdsma in 1994 as head football coach for the Northwest Missouri Bearcats. Tjerdsma went 0–11 in his first season. In 1996 his team made the NCAA Division II playoff and won back to back championships in 1998 and 1999. It has appeared in the championship games in 2005, 2006, 2007 and 2008. The success has resulted in several of its games being broadcast live from the Northwest campus.

In 2000–2003 he oversaw the $5 million overhaul of Bearcat Stadium (renamed from Rickenbrode Stadium).

Attempt to rename the Administration Building
In 2009 students at the school actively sought to rename the school's landmark Administration Building the Dean L. Hubbard Administration Building. When the University Regents refused saying the building should not be named for anybody, the students sought unsuccessfully to oust the regents. Later the Student Senate in April 2009 voted 23–3 in a vote of no confidence in the Board and specifically asked for the removal of Bill Loch, President of the Regents.

After Northwest
In 2010 he was named interim president of St. Luke's College of Health Sciences in Kansas City, Missouri.  He was formally named to the full position in March 2011.

References

1939 births
Andrews University alumni
Stanford University alumni
Yonsei University alumni
Presidents of Northwest Missouri State University
Living people